Mister Softee, Inc. (doing business as Mister Softee) is an American ice cream truck franchisor, best known in the northeastern United States. The company is based in Runnemede, New Jersey.

Business history 
Mister Softee was founded in 1956 by brothers William Aloysius Conway (1922–2004) and James Francis Conway (1927–2006) in Philadelphia, Pennsylvania. Headquartered in Runnemede, New Jersey since 1958, Mister Softee became one of the largest franchisors of soft ice cream in the United States, with about 350 franchisees operating 625 trucks in 18 states. Around 1999, William and James' sons, John P. Conway and Jim Conway, Jr., took over the business.

China 

English-teacher-turned-entrepreneur-now-stand-up-comedian Turner Sparks  was roommates with Alex Conway  – Jim Conway, Jr's. son while attending the University of Miami. Sparks spoke fluent Mandarin and had been teaching English in Suzhou. In 2007, with Alex's help, Sparks launched a Mister Softee China franchise in Suzhou with just one truck. Five years later, Sparks had ten trucks and 25 employees, with plans to expand throughout China's eastern region.

Mister Softee China had created a menu that combined classic American ice cream products of shakes, floats, and sundaes with new Chinese products such as green tea ice cream, red bean ice cream, kiwifruit sundaes, and milk tea floats. While its American counterpart operated almost exclusively with trucks, Mister Softee China had kiosks in downtown shopping areas and trucks throughout China's suburban neighborhoods and business districts.

Mister Softee suspended its China operations in 2016.

Jingle 

The melody broadcast from Mister Softee trucks – bearing the likeness of a music-box – is a contrafactum of Arthur Pryor's 1905 composition, "The Whistler and His Dog." Philadelphia ad man, Les Waas (né Lester Morton Waas; 1921–2016) scored it with new words for Mister Softee, and titled it, "Jingle and Chimes." Waas created close to 1,000 jingles.

"Jingle and Chimes" (lyrics) – , "jaunty"  time
Intro
 Here comes Mister Softee
 The soft ice cream man.
1st verse
 
 
 
 
2nd verse
 
 
3rd verse
 
 
 
 
Coda
 

Michael Bloomberg, while Mayor of New York, launched an ambitious initiative in 2002 to crack-down on city noise, which included jingles broadcast from ice cream trucks – and in particular, the jingle from Mister Softee trucks. In 2005, in the face of opposition from citizens and members of the City Council, he compromised. Rather than banning mobile jingles, he permitted the trucks to air them, but only while in transit.

Trademark infringement cases in New York 
Mister Softee has defended its trademarks, notably in the following two cases:
 Dimitrios Tsirkos, who until 2014 had for decades been a Mister Softee franchisee in New York, launched a competing ice cream vending company, which was incorporated January 24, 2014, in New York under the name Master Softee Inc., and, among other things, used Mister Softee's jingle. Mister Softee, in 2014, sued Tsirkos in U.S. District Court for the Southern District of New York and prevailed on three allegations: (i) breach of franchise agreements, (ii) trademark infringement, and (iii) other unfair business practices. In 2016, U.S. District Judge Laura Taylor Swain held  Tsirkos in contempt for failing to begin payments on a $97,000 judgment handed down in the 2014 case.
 The next year, Mister Softee won, by default, a Federal lawsuit against Dimitrios Konstantakakos and 3 DDD Ice Inc. – owner of New York Ice Cream Truck Inc. of Long Island City – preventing him from using Mister Softee's jingle.

With respect to defending the trademarks, Mister Softee vice president Jim Conway has stated, "For 58 years we've spent our time, energy, and money developing brands. We're one of the most recognized brands. The people who are infringing on our trademark are not only hurting Mr. Softee, but also hurting our mom and pop franchisees. We take these actions to protect them as much to protect our own brand."

Doug Quattlebaum 
In June 1961, Doug Quattlebaum, an American Piedmont blues guitarist, singer and songwriter, was 're-discovered' playing popular and blues songs through the public address system of his Mister Softee ice cream van. The blues historian, Pete Welding, who became known for discovering talent in unusual places, heard his performances and arranged for him to record an album.  Released by Bluesville Records, Softee Man Blues (1963) had a photograph of Quattlebaum in his ice cream uniform on its front cover.

See also 
 Good Humor
 Jack and Jill Ice Cream

Notes

References

External links 

 Official website
 Article about ice cream truck music
 History of the brand in the UK
 Mister Softee Ice Cream Truck Theme/Jingle

Ice cream brands
Ice cream vans
Fast-food franchises
Fast-food chains of the United States
Companies based in Camden County, New Jersey
American companies established in 1956
Restaurants established in 1956
1956 establishments in New Jersey
Cuisine of Philadelphia
Runnemede, New Jersey